Class 4 may refer to:

 British Rail Class 04, British diesel shunting locomotive
 BR Standard Class 4 4-6-0, British steam locomotive
 BR Standard Class 4 2-6-0, British steam locomotive
 BR Standard Class 4 2-6-4T, British steam locomotive
 Class 4 telephone switch
 Class 4, contribution class in the National Insurance system in the UK.
 NSB Class IV, Norwegian narrow-gauge steam locomotive
 NSB El 4, Norwegian electric locomotive
 NSB Di 4, Norwegian diesel locomotive
 SCORE Class 4, off-road racing vehicles
 Speed Class Rating, official unit of speed measurement for SD Cards
 TS Class 4, a tram used in Trondheim, Norway
 Class 4 truck, US truck class for medium trucks, up to 16,000 pounds weight limit
 The fourth class in terms of hiking difficulty in the Yosemite Decimal System
 Missouri Class 4 city

See also

 
 Fourth class (disambiguation)
 Delta class (disambiguation)